The discography of Billy Idol, his solo recordings post-Generation X, consists of eight studio albums, one live album, five compilation albums, two extended plays, and 37 singles.

Discography

Studio albums

Christmas albums

Live albums

Compilation albums

Extended plays

 + Greatest Hits and Devil's Playground failed to chart in The Official UK Top 75 Albums Chart (published by Music Week), but did chart on the complete Top 200 UK Chart published by Charts+Plus (published mainly for music business statistics).

Singles
Starting with the 1983 re-release of "White Wedding", Chrysalis issued Idol's singles with an IDOL vanity catalogue numbering system, which lasted for roughly seven years and sixteen singles (including various re-issues) until the release of "Prodigal Blues" in 1990.

 + "Mony Mony" (1981 release), "Dancing with Myself" (1983 re-release), and "Shock to the System" did not chart on the Billboard Hot 100 but appeared on the Billboard Bubbling Under Hot 100 Singles chart.

Promotional singles

Other appearances

Videography

Video albums

Music videos

 Versions of "Hot in the City":
 Original Version
 Uncensored Version
 Ur-Version

 Versions of "Sweet Sixteen":
 Original Version
 Colored Version

 Versions of "Cradle of Love":
 Original Version
 Extended Billy Idol Only Version

 Versions of "Heroin":
 LP Version
 Radio Edit
 Uncut Version
 Blendo Version
 Overlords Version
 Overlords-R rated Version
 Garcia Mix
 Garcia Mix-R rated

 Versions of "Shock to the System":
 Original Version
 Blendo Version

References

External links
 

Discographies of British artists
New wave discographies